Michael Glenn Williams (born October 23, 1957 in Lancaster, California) is an American composer, pianist and technologist.

Biography
Williams' earliest years were spent in New York City, beginning trumpet studies and composing at 8 years old. At age 12 he was programming DEC PDP 8 minicomputers. He attended CSU Northridge as a dual major in composition and piano performance where he studied with Aurelio de la Vega, Daniel Kessner, Frank Campo, and Francoise Regnat. He pioneered composing for FM synthesis combined with music concrete and acoustic instruments. He did graduate studies at the Eastman School of Music as a composition major, where he taught undergraduate electronic music, and worked with Samuel Adler, Robert Morris, Warren Benson, pianist Rebecca Penneys, and briefly with Joseph Schwantner and David Burge.

Performance career
Williams is performing as pianist in The Chopin Project, with the jazz group 1 40 4 20, and as a studio pianist for film and television. As composer-in-residence at the Lake Como Festival 2010, he performed as recitalist for the International Piano Academy's Piano Master series. He premiered works written for him by Jeffery Cotton, Jeff Rona and other composers. He twice won the Northridge Chamber Music Award for performances of contemporary music. Williams also regularly releases performances on his Facebook page and YouTube channel "Michael's Piano Bar."

Works
Williams composes for solo piano, chamber ensembles, choir and solo voice. Works for orchestra include Video Games Concerto, New West Overture, Rising Stars Overture, Oceanic Overture, American Prairie Sketches, Tarantella for piano and orchestra, composed for pianist Sean Chen; Princess Concerto for piano, narrator and orchestra; and The Gates of Hell a series of tone poems based on the Rodin sculptures. Williams catalogue for solo piano is extensive, with over twenty suites. Williams also composed for movies including King of the Hill, The Limey, Younger and Younger, The House of Yes, Wonderland and Wicker Park. He also composed cues and performed piano for the TV series Chicago Hope.

Notable recordings
 For The Young Artist: Sean Chen Plays the Works of Michael Glenn Williams Navona Records, Sean Chen Pianist
 Fine Music  Navona Records, Sean Chen Pianist
 Digital Animation Stradivarius Records, Enrico Pompili and Gabriele Baldocci pianists
 Lyricism: Songs Without Words, AIX Records, Roberto Prosseda, pianist
 Chroma, Capstone, Jeri-Mae Astolfi pianist
 Wet, Pocket Jazz Records, Michael Williams with 1 40 4 20, artists
 Jazz Trespassers, Pocket Jazz Records, 1 40 4 20 artists

Technologist
As a technologist, Williams has served as the Vice Chair of the IEEE 802.21 working group, secretary for the IEEE 1275 Open Firmware working group, and member of the IEEE 1754 Open Microprocessor working group. He authored the program SuperScore, one of the first computer editing and printing programs for music. He authored articles for the IEICE, Music Technology, Electronic Music Educator, and Klavier. He was awarded the title of Leading Scientist while working at Nokia. He holds patents in a variety of areas including network security, clustering, authentication and secure search.

External links and references 
 Michael Williams website
 SuperScore Announcement at CES https://web.archive.org/web/20060208022502/http://landley.net/history/mirror/8bits/ti99/time1987.htm
 Directions in Media Independent Handover, IEICE Transactions https://web.archive.org/web/20090224182248/http://ietfec.oxfordjournals.org/cgi/content/abstract/E88-A/7/1772
 The Chopin Project https://www.youtube.com/user/gwizvideo
 Announcement of IEEE 1754 Open Microprocessor Standard http://mail-index.netbsd.org/port-sparc/1994/03/19/0000.html
 IEEE Std 1275-1994: IEEE Standard for Boot Firmware (Initialization Configuration) Firmware: Core Requirements and Practices (ISBN Number: 1-55937-426-8)
 Interactive Broadcast Television
Digital Baton Patent
 Clustering Patent
 Patent for Prioritized Network Access for emergencies Cited by 
  Patent for Parallel Scanning of network traffic by multiple entities 
 Patent for Dynamic, continuous, authenticated web, email and messaging search and query system
 Patent for Integrated voice mail and email with searchable voice Cited by

Specific

1957 births
Living people
20th-century classical composers
20th-century American composers
20th-century American pianists
20th-century American male musicians
21st-century classical composers
21st-century classical pianists
21st-century American composers
21st-century American pianists
21st-century American male musicians
Contemporary classical music performers
Composers for piano
American classical composers
American male classical composers
American classical pianists
American male pianists
Male classical pianists
Pupils of Samuel Adler (composer)